Stein an der Enns is a village in the administrative district of Liezen, in the Austrian state of Styria. It is located in the valley of the river Enns, and part of the municipality Sölk.

External links
Municipality Großsölk 

Cities and towns in Liezen District